Philipp Mainländer (5 October 1841 – 1 April 1876) was a German philosopher and poet. Born Philipp Batz, he later changed his name to "Mainländer" in homage to his hometown, Offenbach am Main.

In his central work  (The Philosophy of Redemption or The Philosophy of Salvation) — according to Theodor Lessing, "perhaps the most radical system of pessimism known to philosophical literature" — Mainländer proclaims that life is worthless, and that "the will, ignited by the knowledge that non-being is better than being, is the supreme principle of morality."

Biography

Early life and career 

Born in Offenbach am Main, on October 5, 1841 "as a child of marital rape", Philipp Mainländer grew up the youngest of six siblings. One of his brothers was mentally ill, according to Cesare Lombroso in The Man of Genius, as had been one of his grandfathers who had died at the age of 33.

Mainländer attended the Realschule in Offenbach from 1848 to 1856. In 1856, at his father's instruction, he entered the commercial school of Dresden to become a merchant. Two years later, he was employed in a trading house in Naples, Italy, where he learned Italian and acquainted himself with the works of Dante, Petrarca, Boccaccio, and – most notably – Leopardi. Mainländer would later describe his five Neapolitan years as the happiest ones of his life.

During this critical period of his life, Mainländer discovered Arthur Schopenhauer's central work The World as Will and Representation. Nineteen years old at the time, he would later describe the event as a penetrating revelation, referring to February 1860 as the "most important of [his] life". Indeed, Schopenhauer would remain the most important influence on Mainländer's later philosophical work.

In 1863, Mainländer returned to Germany to work in his father's business. In the same year, he also penned the three-part poem  ("The Last Hohenstaufens"). Two years later, on 5 October, Mainländer's 24th birthday, his mother died. Deeply affected by this experience of loss, Mainländer began an ongoing turn away from poetry and towards philosophy. During the following years, he studied Schopenhauer, Kant – ("not poisoned through Fichte, Schelling and Hegel, but rather critically strengthened through Schopenhauer"), Eschenbach's Parzival, and the classics of philosophy from Heraclitus to Condillac.

In March 1869, Mainländer worked in the banking house J. Mart. Magnus in Berlin with the declared goal of amassing a small fortune within a few years and then leading a decent life from the interest earnings. In 1873, Mainländer resigned from his post at the bank without really knowing what he would do afterwards.

Development of Die Philosophie der Erlösung 

Although his wealthy parents had bought off his military service in 1861, Mainländer – according to an autobiographic note – expressed the desire "to be absolutely in all things submitted to another one once, to do the lowermost work, to have to obey blindly" and sedulously undertook numerous attempts to serve with weapons. On 6 April 1874, Mainländer, already 32 years old, submitted a request directly to the emperor Wilhelm I of Germany which was granted; this resulted in his appointment to the Cuirassiers in Halberstadt, beginning 28 September. During the four months leading up to his conscription, Mainländer, obsessed with work, composed the first volume of his main work Die Philosophie der Erlösung. Describing this time, he later wrote:And now an enchanting life began, a spiritual blossoming full of bliss and blissful shivers. […] This life lasted four full months; it filled June, July, August and September. Completely clear, consistent, and well-rounded was my system in my mind, and a creative frenzy revived me that did not need the whip of the thought that I must be finished by 28 September; for on 1 October I had to put on the king's coat - this date could not be postponed. If I hadn't finished by then, it would take three years for me to put the finishing touches on my work, i.e. I would have seen myself thrown into an abyss into which the furies of a broken existence would inevitably have thrown me.Mainländer handed the completed manuscript to his sister Minna, asking her to find a publisher while he completed his military service. The author composed a letter to the as yet unknown publisher, requesting the omission of his birth name and substitution of the pen name "Philipp Mainländer", and stating that he would abhor nothing more than "being exposed to the eyes of the world".

On 1 November 1875, Mainländer – originally committed for three years, but in the meantime, as he noted in a letter to Minna, "exhausted, worked-out, ... at completely ... healthy body ineffably tired" – was prematurely released from military service, and traveled back to his hometown of Offenbach, where he – again having become obsessed with work – within a mere two months, corrected the unbound sheets of Die Philosophie der Erlösung, composed his memoirs, wrote the novella Rupertine del Fino, and completed the 650-page second volume of his magnum opus.

Death 
Around the beginning of 1876, Mainländer began to doubt whether his life still had value for humanity. He wondered whether he had already completed the duties of life, or whether he should employ it to strengthen the social democratic movement. Despite writing down addresses to the German workers, these plans did not materialize. Very shortly after the publication of the first volume of his main work, he ended his life by hanging himself. Mainländer was buried in Offenbach cemetery.

Philosophy

Working in the metaphysical framework of Schopenhauer, Mainländer sees the "will" as the innermost core of being, the ontological arche. However, he deviates from Schopenhauer in important respects. With Schopenhauer the will is singular, unified and beyond time and space. Schopenhauer's transcendental idealism leads him to conclude that we only have access to a certain aspect of the thing-in-itself by introspective observation of our own bodies. What we observe as will is all there is to observe, nothing more. There are no hidden aspects. Furthermore, via introspection we can only observe our individual will. This also leads Mainländer to the philosophical position of pluralism. The goals he set for himself and for his system are reminiscent of ancient Greek philosophy: what is the relation between the undivided existence of the "One" and the everchanging world of becoming that we experience.

Additionally, Mainländer accentuates on the idea of salvation for all of creation. This is yet another respect in which he differentiates his philosophy from that of Schopenhauer. With Schopenhauer, the silencing of the will is a rare event. The artistic genius can achieve this state temporarily, while only a few saints have achieved total cessation throughout history. For Mainländer, the entirety of the cosmos is slowly but surely moving towards the silencing of the will to live and to (as he calls it) "redemption".

Mainländer theorized that an initial singularity dispersed and expanded into the known universe. This dispersion from a singular unity to a multitude of things offered a smooth transition between monism and pluralism. Mainländer thought that with the regression of time, all kinds of pluralism and multiplicity would revert to monism and he believed that, with his philosophy, he had managed to explain this transition from oneness to multiplicity and becoming.

Death of God 

Despite his scientific means of explanation, Mainländer was not afraid to philosophize in allegorical terms. Formulating his own "myth of creation", Mainländer equated this initial singularity with God.

Mainländer reinterprets Schopenhauer's metaphysics in two important aspects. Primarily, in Mainländer's system there is no "singular will". The basic unity has broken apart into individual wills and each subject in existence possesses an individual will of his own. Because of this, Mainländer can claim that once an "individual will" is silenced and dies, it achieves absolute nothingness and not the relative nothingness we find in Schopenhauer. By recognizing death as salvation and by giving nothingness an absolute quality, Mainländer's system manages to offer "wider" means for redemption. Secondarily, Mainländer reinterprets the Schopenhauerian will-to-live as an underlying will-to-die, i.e. the will-to-live is the means towards the will-to-die.

Ethics 
Mainländer's philosophy also carefully inverts other doctrines. For instance, Epicurus sees happiness only in pleasure and since there is nothing after death, there is nothing to fear and/or desire from death. Yet Mainländer, being a philosophical pessimist, sees no desirable pleasure in this life and praises the sublime nothingness of death, recognizing precisely this state of non-existence as desirable.

Mainländer espouses an ethics of egoism. That is to say that what is best for an individual is what makes one happiest. Yet all pursuits and cravings lead to pain. Thus, Mainländer concludes that a will-to-death is best for the happiness of all and knowledge of this transforms one's will-to-life (an illusory existence unable to attain happiness) into the proper (sought by God) will-to-death. Ultimately, the subject (individual will) is one with the universe, in harmony with it and with its originating will, if one wills nothingness. Based on these premises, Mainländer makes the distinction between the "ignorant" and the "enlightened" type of self-interest. Ignorant self-interest seeks to promote itself and capitalize on its will-to-live. In contrast, enlightened self-interest humbles the individual and leads him to asceticism, as that aligns him properly with the elevating will-towards-death.

Personality 
It was noted by critics that his work reveals a gentle and warmhearted personality. Lucien Arréat expressed that many pages feel warm due to the "generosity of his soul", and as a more general characterization that "Mainländer had a delicate and sincere nature, a truly remarkable individuality." 

Frederick C. Beiser also notes "Mainländer's humanity": "He had the deepest sympathy for the suffering of the common man and much of his thinking was preoccupied with the poverty of the mass of people and the workers. … It is not the least token of Mainländer's humanity that he was sympathetic to the Jews, whose charity and sagacity he much admired."

Reception 

Nietzsche immediately read Die Philosophie der Erlösung in the year it was published, before any review had appeared. The work contributed to his final separation from Schopenhauer's philosophy. In his own works, Nietzsche gave no attention to Mainländer until a decade later, that is, in the second, expanded edition of The Gay Science, the same book in which he had introduced the phrase "God is dead" in the first edition five years prior: "Could one count such dilettantes and old maids as the sickeningly sentimental apostle of virginity, Mainländer, as a genuine German? After all he was probably a Jew – (all Jews become sentimental when they moralize)." It has been suggested that Mainländer was more than a mere influence, and was instead plagiarized.

Nietzsche also mentions in one of his letters that he met an adherent of Mainländer's philosophy, "a quiet and modest man, a Buddhist […], passionate vegetarian." The "modest man" told Nietzsche that Mainländer was, in fact, not a Jew.<ref>Friedrich Nietzsche: Letter to Heinrich Köselitz, 17/05/1888 — Er hat mir bewiesen, daß Mainländer kein Jude war. —"</ref>

In the same period, Max Seiling wrote that he believed Mainländer to be one of the few wise heroes to have walked on this earth.

Mainländer's work was not well received by authorities. In Imperial Russia, Mainländer's essay on the esoteric meaning of the Trinity was banned. In the German Reichstag, Die Philosophie der Erlösung was brought up to the rostrum on occasion of the Anti-Socialist Laws. Prominent socialists however took interest in his work. The socialist leader August Bebel refers to and uses the arguments of the pessimistic philosopher in his feminist work Woman and Socialism. Bebel mentions Mainländer's sister in his autobiography. Also Eduard Bernstein wrote that he was "very interested" in Mainländer. Ferdinand Domela Nieuwenhuis (1846–1919), the first prominent Dutch socialist, considered Mainländer's work a "great contribution" for socialism.

Alfred Kubin, one of the founders of Der Blaue Reiter, wrote about Die Philosophie der Erlösung, "this work – which expresses my actual thoughts and steels and strengthens me – this philosophy, forms the consolation of my life and death."

The Japanese writer Akutagawa wrote in A Note to a Certain Old Friend, "I read Mainländer, whose work has become deeply ingrained in my consciousness." He also refers to Mainländer in his novel Kappa.

Emil Cioran was very impressed by the work of Mainländer. When he discovered that Jorge Luis Borges had written about Mainländer, he started a correspondence with Borges on Mainländer.

Works
In English:
 The Philosophy of Redemption (Vol. I & Vol. II) – currently being translated

In German:
 Die Philosophie der Erlösung (Vol. I: 1876; Vol. II: 1886)
 Die Letzten Hohenstaufen. Ein dramatisches Gedicht in drei Theilen: Enzo – Manfred – Conradino (1876)
 Die Macht der Motive. Literarischer Nachlaß von 1857 bis 1875 (1999)

In Spanish:
 Filosofía de la redención (translation by Manuel Pérez Cornejo; Ediciones Xorki, 2014)

 See also 
 Buddhist modernism
 Death of God theology
 God became the universe
 Apocatastasis
 Universal reconciliation

 Notes 

 References 

 Further reading 
 Beiser, Frederick C., Weltschmerz: Pessimism in German Philosophy, 1860-1900'', Oxford: Oxford University Press, 2016.

External links 

 
 The Riddles of Philosophy, Part II, Chapter VI: Modern Idealistic World Conceptions. An essay by Rudolph Steiner that mentions Mainländer.
 Aleksander Samarin's entry on Mainländer in his Enigma of Immortality.
 The rotting God - Mainländer's Metaphysics of Entropy.
 Fabio Ciracì, "La filosofia della redenzione di Philipp Mainlaender", Pensa MultiMedia, Lecce 2006.

1841 births
1876 deaths
1870s suicides
19th-century German male writers
19th-century German writers
19th-century German philosophers
19th-century German poets
Anti-natalists
German social democrats
German socialists
People from the Grand Duchy of Hesse
People from Offenbach am Main
Philosophers of pessimism
Suicides by hanging in Germany